The Casa De Muchas Flores (also known as the Miller-Babet House) is a historic home in St. Petersburg, Florida. It is located at 1446 Park Street North. On January 31, 1985, it was added to the U.S. National Register of Historic Places.

References

External links
 Pinellas County listings at National Register of Historic Places
 Pinellas County listings at Florida's Office of Cultural and Historical Programs

Houses on the National Register of Historic Places in Florida
Houses in St. Petersburg, Florida
National Register of Historic Places in Pinellas County, Florida